Narew Landscape Park (Narwiański Park Krajobrazowy) was a  Polish Landscape Park designated protected area within Podlaskie Voivodeship in northeastern Poland.

Geography
It was established in 1985, and is a Natura 2000 EU Special Protection Area.

It provides a buffer zone for Narew National Park.

History 
It was established in the then Białystok Voivodeship under the Resolution of the Provincial National Council in Białystok of September 30, 1985. In 1989, by virtue of the resolution of WRN in Łomża, the areas belonging to the then Łomża Voivodeship were incorporated into the Park. The main task of the Park Management in the first years of its operation was to restore the section of the Narew Valley between Żółtki and the Rzędziany-Pańka dyke in order to restore the boggy and natural character. At that time, until 1990, the director of the Landscape Park was Bolesław Bielicki; in 1991 this function was performed by Witold Rurarz-Lipiński, and from the end of 1991 to the beginning of 1994 — by Andrzej Grygoruk (who also served as director in the years 1990–1991). In 1996, the Narew Landscape Park was transformed into the Narew National Park (a national park was created from a part of the area of the landscape park, the rest lies in its buffer zone).

See also

Special Protection Areas in Poland

References

Narew
Parks in Podlaskie Voivodeship
Natura 2000 in Poland
1985 establishments in Poland
Protected areas established in 1985